Bellorchestia marmorata is a marine amphipod in the Talitridae family.

It was first described in 1880 by William Aitcheson Haswell as Talorchestia marmorata, was also described by Thomas Roscoe Rode Stebbing in 1906 as Orchestia marmorata, and in 2008 was reassigned to the genus, Bellorchestia.

It is found only in the supralittoral zones of Tasmania's coastlines.

References

External links
Bellorchestia marmorata images & occurrence data from GBIF.

Gammaridea
Crustaceans of Australia
Crustaceans described in 1880
Taxa named by William Aitcheson Haswell